Dean Omori (born Dean Francis Bedwell, 5 July 1968) is an English singer-songwriter, poet and producer. Omori is the Japanese word for "big forest".

His work is often connected to humanitarian causes and addresses human rights, war, environment, prejudice and philosophical issues. Omori is the founder of The Art of Protest, an organisation set up to encourage protest through art and music.

Personal life
Born in Great Yarmouth, an eastern English seaside town that saw an influx of Italian immigrants in the 1930s and 1940s, one of whom was Omori's mother.

He began guitar lessons at the age of 6 but was not a natural. He said he never really could understand the point of playing other peoples music. His undiagnosed dyslexia dogged him throughout his school life but this complicated relationship with language became a fascination that would form the basis of a more coherent means of communication through music and words in the following decades. Divorce, adoption, wealth and poverty shaped his early years until he met his future wife at sixteen and disappeared to a future that would show him music, books and art. By the age of 19 Omori was studying jazz, the romantic poets and had begun to write his own compositions.
 
Omori lives in Norwich with his wife and two children.

Early career
As agents and record company promises had come and gone, Omori remained focused on his songwriting. In later years Omori would argue that he has written more songs than most people have heard. But with the birth of his first child Omori gave up music to look after his children. It was not until part way through the first decade of the new millennium that he would take to his music again, but by this time Omori had found his voice.

Music and film
In 2006, Omori picked up his guitar again and began to write the songs that would eventually make up his first album TEN WAR SONGS. In the following years he would have written, performed and produced 14 albums. Omori began making short films to accompany his music. In 2008 the World Wide Fund for nature (WWF) awarded him best film and music for How Can You Sleep. His songs' lyrics have been translated into French, Spanish and Japanese.
 
In 2010, Omori was discovered by Malcolm Holmes of OMD and signed to the label Fin Music. His music and film Censorship Burns The Books Nobody Reads was used by Freemuse to help support their cause, highlighting the persecution of artists and musicians around the world.

In 2011, he was invited to write the music celebrating Amnesty International's 50th year, which was released in May and has toured supporting their cause. In 2016, his album 'Got Daddy Gone' was written for War Child to draw attention to the ongoing war in Syria.

In 2013, he left his record company to independently release a new album Sean Penn. After the split he has remained an independent artist with full control to write, perform, produce and record all of his material.

Omori works often with Sophie Vaughan, cellist and vocalist. Daughter of Ivan Vaughan, was a boyhood friend of John Lennon, and later schoolmate of Paul McCartney. He played bass part-time in Lennon's first band, The Quarrymen, and was responsible for introducing Lennon to Paul McCartney at a community event (the Woolton village fête) on 6 July 1957, where The Quarrymen were performing. McCartney impressed Lennon, who invited McCartney to join the band, which he did a day later. This led to the formation of Lennon and McCartney's songwriting partnership, and later of The Beatles.

Albums

Street - 2023: Deans most emotional album. Uncluttered with crowd pleasing standard tropes, Street stands alone for both its originality and its power. It bares its soul for the time in which we live.
Post Original - 2022: A beautiful album that focuses on human nature in the modern world and how we struggle to connect and love each other when we need it most.
 Whole Cowardly Bundle of Art - 2021: In the time of George Floyd and a world in Covid lockdown, comes Deans 13th album. An album that heaves with perspective and poetry in a world shaken by  political and global events.
11th Commandment - 2020: Written and released in lockdown at the time of COVID-19, highlighting the vulnerability of the natural world both viral and ecological. "This thing is our revolution, we’ve been divided enough, this thing will bring us all together, this is sleight of hand love"
The Artist	- 2019: 13 songs of an artist. The opening track "Love Letter to a Younger Self" offers a proud and amusing letter to a young person telling them that the future will be positive. The album is lyrically profound and amusing. "We’re not perfect but once we gave the world Mathematics and Love"
Witness and Testify -	2018: Possibly his most personal album. The internal struggle with what he sees and feels and how that is interpreted into music. "Unthank Road" is an autobiographical account of his life with other songs inspired by the Grenfell Tower fire, and the London and Manchester terror attacks.
Music for an Unknown Revolution  -  2017: A soundtrack capturing the feeling of revolution when there is none and the power of this. The album was written whilst staying in a Judges house in the South of France. The cover was viewed as pornographic in some world territories but was eventually accepted and released.
Got Daddy Gone - 2016: Inspired by the global refugee crisis, the little Syrian boy washed up on a beach and how humanity failed those who had lost everything in a time of war. Got Daddy Gone was supported by and dedicated to War Child.
The Heroin View -	2015: This is an album about outsiders, addicts and artists who make art out of their demons. A bold statement on love and music.
Holocaust and the Whale -	2014: Inspired by Melville, Holocaust and the Whale puts the persecution of the Jews and the violation of man's greed in the same boat.
Sean Penn - 2013: A bold and muscular album which did not suit his record company. As a result, Omori decided to go it alone and this his fifth album, is the first release under The Art of Protest label.
I Can Save the World -	2012: Playing with a new palette of musical styles, Tango, dance, Gypsy and acoustic hip-hop, here Omori is beginning to push his musical and lyrical boundaries.
Words of Freedom -	2011: Words of Freedom, a potent protest album.
List of My Demands	- 2010: A collection of sleight of hand love songs. "Sound of the Earth Spinning" has been covered many times and translated into various languages including Spanish, Japanese and French.
The Immortal Death of Samuel Escobar - 2009: 11 fictitious protest songs from the pen of a South American poet.
I Want to be Pregnant - 2008: Mostly an album of longing.
Squaw - 2007: This is a compilation of Omori's first two albums. 'Ten War Songs' which was deleted following the end of the Iraq war and "The Last Artist Died Today". This was the first time Omori introduced the vocal talents of Sophie Vaughan, who he would work with for many years. A short film made to accompany "How Can You Sleep" won an award from the World Wide Fund for Nature in 2008.

References

External links

Award winning singer songwriter releases 11th album EDP. Award-winning singer-songwriter releases 11th album.

1968 births
Living people
People from Great Yarmouth
English male singer-songwriters
English male poets
21st-century English novelists
English male novelists
21st-century English male writers